There are at least 23 named lakes and reservoirs in Lafayette County, Arkansas.

Lakes
	1927 Cut-off Lake, el.  
	Battle Lake, el.  
	Blue Hole, el.  
	Cargill Pond, el.  
	Copeland Lake, el.  
	Duck Lake, el.  
	Grassy Lake, el.  
	Mays Lake, el.  
	Mays Lake, el.  
	Spirit Lake, el.  
	Swan Lake, el.

Reservoirs
	Barmes Pond, el.  
	Buehler Herndon Lake Number Two, el.  
	Buehler Herndon Number One Reservoir, el.  
	Enyart Lake, el.  
	Lake Erling, el.  
	Lake June, el.  
	Lower Lake Jew Jon, el.  
	Meriwether Pond, el.  
	Moore Lake, el.  
	New Meriwether Pond, el.  
	Strange Lake, el.  
	Upper Jew-Jon Lake, el.

See also

 List of lakes in Arkansas

Notes

Bodies of water of Lafayette County, Arkansas
Lafayette